Waltz for Debby is a 1964 album in English and Swedish by the American jazz pianist Bill Evans and the Swedish singer Monica Zetterlund.

It was reissued by Verve Records in 2006.

Reception

Writing for Allmusic, music critic Thom Jurek wrote of the album: "The match is seemingly perfect. Evans' lyricism is well suited to a breezy, sophisticated songstress like Monica Zetterlund. There is an iciness on this recording, but it is difficult to decipher if it is in the performance or in the engineering where she seems to be way out in front of the band, when she was really in the middle of all the musicians in the studio... The Swedish version of "Waltz for Debby" is a true delight because Zetterlund's voice becomes another instrument, soloing over the top of Evans' stunning selection of comping chords. In all this is an odd but special item, one that is necessary—for at least one listen—by any serious fan of the pianist and composer."

Track listing
"Come Rain or Come Shine" (Harold Arlen, Johnny Mercer) – 4:41
"A Beautiful Rose (Jag vet en dejlig rosa) – 2:53
"Once Upon a Summertime" (Eddie Barclay, Michel Legrand, Johnny Mercer) – 3:03
"So Long Big Time" (Harold Arlen, Dory Previn) – 3:49
"Waltz for Debby (Monicas Vals)" (Bill Evans, Beppe Wolgers) – 2:47
"Lucky to Be Me" (Leonard Bernstein) – 3:36
"Sorrow Wind (Vindarna Sucka) – 3:03
"It Could Happen to You" (Johnny Burke, Jimmy Van Heusen) – 3:00
"Some Other Time" (Leonard Bernstein, Betty Comden, Adolph Green) – 5:35
"In the Night (Om Natten)" (Olle Adolphson) – 1:40

Personnel
 Bill Evans – piano
 Monica Zetterlund – vocals
Larry Bunker – drums
Chuck Israels – bass

References

External links
Jazz Discography entries for Bill Evans
Bill Evans Memorial Library discography

1964 albums
Bill Evans albums
Monica Zetterlund albums
Verve Records albums